Surreal Estate is a 1976 French mystery film directed by Argentine filmmaker Eduardo de Gregorio, who is best known for his screenwriting work with Jacques Rivette.

Plot 
Surreal Estate tells the story of Eric Sange (Corin Redgrave), an English novelist who, seeking to buy a house in France as an investment, discovers a run-down mansion inhabited by three strange women: Ariane (Rivette regular Bulle Ogier), Agathe (Marie-France Pisier), and their ostensible housekeeper, Céleste (Leslie Caron). Together, these women draw Eric into a gothic mystery that his own novelistic experience tells him is hackneyed, but which he nonetheless finds irresistible.

Cast 
 Bulle Ogier as Ariane
 Marie-France Pisier as Agathe
 Corin Redgrave as Eric Sange
 Leslie Caron as Céleste 
 Marylin Jones as the waitress
 Pierre Baudry as the bar owner

Reception
Imran Khan of PopMatters says of the film: "Very much a film of its time, it helped to corner a market in French cinema that had seen a tiny flourish of fantasy-themed dramas first initiated by Jacques Rivette’s Céline and Julie Go Boating (1974), a film that dispensed with logic and chronology for a shattered perspective on cinematic narrative."

References

External links

French mystery films
1970s French films